Margam Abbey was a Cistercian monastery, located in the village of Margam, a suburb of modern Port Talbot in  Wales.

History

The abbey was founded in 1147 as a daughter house of Clairvaux by Robert, Earl of Gloucester, and was dedicated to the Blessed Virgin Mary.  Early Christian crosses found in the close vicinity and conserved in the nearby Margam Stones Museum suggest the existence of an earlier Celtic monastic community.  The founding abbot was William of Clairvaux. The third abbot, Conan, enjoyed the praise of Giraldus Cambrensis, whom he appears to have entertained prior to his official visit with Baldwin of Forde, Archbishop of Canterbury, to preach the Crusade in 1188. Conan (or Cunan) contributed to Patristic literature, as he is credited with the capitula or chapter-headings prefixing each section of St. Bernard's Sermons on the Song of Songs, one of the works for which that author was titled a Doctor of the Church.

The Annales de Margan are a contemporary chronicle in Latin, beginning with the death of Edward the Confessor in 1066 and ending with Henry III's quarrel with Hubert de Burgh in the year 1232. The chief source for the earlier portion was likely William of Malmesbury's history. The text gives accounts of the purported discovery of the bones of King Arthur, and of the alleged murder of Prince Arthur by King John.

Sir John Buchanan-Jardine (third baronet Buchanan-Jardine) recounts a tradition that Margam Abbey kept a pack of hunting hounds donated to them by a continental Abbey (which he takes to be the Abbey of Saint-Hubert).

The abbey was dissolved by King Henry VIII of England in 1536 and sold to Sir Rice Mansel. Significant holdings of the monastery library appear to have survived this event, including the manuscript of the annals. At this time, only 12 monks were living in the monastery.  From the Mansel family the abbey eventually passed to their descendants in the female line, the Talbot family.  In the 19th century, C R M Talbot constructed a mansion at Margam Castle which overlooks the abbey ruins.  The nave of the abbey continued in use as the parish church, as it does to this day. It is Anglo-Catholic in its churchmanship.

Today

Margam Abbey now consists of the intact nave and surrounding ruins.  Those ruins not belonging to the church are now owned by the County Council.  These remains, including the twelve-sided chapter house, dating from the 13th century, stand within 840 acre (3.4 km2) Margam Country Park, close to Margam Castle. The Abbey church of St Mary, the ruined Chapter House and the Abbey undercroft are all Grade I listed buildings.

On a hill overlooking the abbey stand the ruins of an outlying monastery building, Capel Mair ar y Bryn ("the chapel of St Mary on the hill"). The purpose of this building is thought to have been to allow members of the monastic community who were engaged in the keeping of flocks to fulfil their devotional obligations without having to return to the main church.

Tree of the Year 2020 

In 2020, a beech tree located in the ruins of Margam Abbey was voted Tree of the Year in Wales. 

The 'Chapter House Tree' won an online vote conducted by the Welsh Woodland Trust, beating other trees such as the Monmouth Catalpa Tree and the Chirk Castle Sweet Chestnut. It was awarded £1000 as a prize, and received 1118 votes.

See also 
Margam Country Park
Margam Stones Museum
List of monastic houses in Wales
List of Scheduled Monuments in Neath Port Talbot

Photos
Original Abbey Complex:
www.geograph.co.uk : photos of Margam Abbey

Notes

References
 A History of Margam Abbey, Walter de Gray Birch, Bedford Press, 1897
Bernard de Clairvaux, Sermons sur le Cantique Tome I (Sermons 1–15); introduction,traduction et notes par Paul VERDEYEN, s.j. et Raffaele FASSETT, o.c.s.o., 1996 (Sources Chrétiennes, no. 414), p. 55.

Margam
Cistercian monasteries in Wales
Ruins in Wales
Buildings and structures in Neath Port Talbot
1147 establishments in Europe
Religious organizations established in the 1140s
Christian monasteries established in the 12th century
Tourist attractions in Neath Port Talbot
Ruined abbeys and monasteries
Grade I listed buildings in Neath Port Talbot
Anglo-Catholic church buildings in Wales
Church in Wales church buildings
12th-century establishments in Wales
Monasteries dissolved under the English Reformation